The first elections to the Carmarthenshire County Council were held on 4 May 1995. It was followed by the 1999 election. Results are drawn from the national and local press.

Overview

|}

Results

Abergwili (one seat)

Ammanford (one seat)

Betws (one seat)

Bigyn (three seats)

Burry Port (two seats)

Bynea (one seat)

Carmarthen Town North (two seats)

Carmarthen Town South (two seats)

Carmarthen Town West (two seats)

Cenarth (one seat)

Clynderwen (one seat)

Cross Hands (one seat)

Cynwyl Elfed (one seat)

Cynwyl Gaeo and Llanwrda /Talley (one seat)

Dafen (one seat)

Elli (one seat)

Felinfoel (one seat)

Garnant (one seat)

Glanaman (one seat)

Glanymor (two seats)

Glyn (one seat)

Gorslas (two seats)

Hendy (one seat)

Hengoed (two seats)

Kidwelly (one seat)

Laugharne Township (one seat)

Llanboidy (one seat)

Llanddarog (one seat)

Llanddowror (one seat)

Llandeilo, Tywi and Castle (one seat)

Llandovery Town (one seat)

Llandybie and Heolddu (two seats)

Llandyfaelog (one seat)

Llanegwad and Llanfynydd (one seat)

Llanfihangel Aberbythych (one seat)

Llanfihangel-ar-Arth (one seat)

Llangeler (one seat)

Llangennech (two seats)

Llangunnor (one seat)

Llangyndeyrn (one seat)

Llansadwrn and Llangadog / Myddfai and Llanddeusant (one seat)

Llansteffan (one seat)

Llanybydder/Llanllwni (one seat)

Lliedi (two seats)

Llwynhendy (two seats)

Manordeilo and Salem / Ffairfach (one seat)

Myddynfych (one seat)

Newchurch (one seat)

Pantyffynnon (one seat)

Pembrey (two seats)

Pencarreg (one seat)

Penygroes (one seat)

Pontamman (one seat)

Pontyberem (one seat)

Quarter Bach / Llynfell / Brynamman (one seat)

St Clears (one seat)

St Ishmaels (one seat)

Saron (one seat)

Swiss Valley (one seat)

Trelech (one seat)

Trimsaran (one seat)

Tumble (two seats)

Tycroes (one seat)

Tyisha (two seats)

Whitland (one seat)

By-elections 1995-99

Penygroes 1996

A by-election was held in the Penygroes ward following the death of Plaid Cymru councillor Ceirwyn Davies. Lynne Davies, who had previously represented the ward on Dinefwr Borough Council from 1976 until 1996 was elected in his place.

Carmarthen Town South 1997
A by-election was held in the Carmarthen Town South ward following the death of Liberal Democrat councillor Dr Margaret Evans.

Burry Port 1998
A by-election was held in the Burry Port ward following the death of Liberal Democrat councillor George West.

References 

1995
1995 Welsh local elections
20th century in Carmarthenshire